Helluomorphoides praeustus is a species of flat-horned ground beetle in the family Carabidae. It is found in North America.

Subspecies
These three subspecies belong to the species Helluomorphoides praeustus:
 Helluomorphoides praeustus bicolor (T. Harris, 1828)
 Helluomorphoides praeustus floridanus Ball, 1956
 Helluomorphoides praeustus praeustus (Dejean, 1825)

References

Further reading

 

Harpalinae
Articles created by Qbugbot
Beetles described in 1825